Peter M Tessier is a biochemical engineering award-winner and protein-engineering expert. His work with therapeutic proteins has the potential for detecting and treating devastating diseases (including cancer and Alzheimer’s disease).

Awards
Some of the awards and recognition for the pioneering work he has engineered include:

 American Cancer Society Postdoctoral Fellowship, 2004-2007
 Young Scientist Award, World Economic Forum (Tianjin, China), 2014
 National Science Foundation CAREER Award, 2010-2015
 Pew Scholar Award in Biomedical Sciences, 2010-2014
 Rensselaer Early Career Award, School of Engineering Research Excellence Award (2012); Rensselaer School of Engineering Teaching Excellence Award, 2013 and the following year its Dept. of Chemical & Biological Engineering Teaching Award
 Young Investigator Award, Biochemical Engineering Journal, 2016
 Fellow, American Institute for Medical and Biological Engineering, 2018, “ for outstanding contributions in the design, engineering and selection of monoclonal antibodies for therapeutic applications.”

References

Living people
Year of birth missing (living people)
American biochemists
Place of birth missing (living people)
Fellows of the American Institute for Medical and Biological Engineering